Madawaska—Restigouche is a federal electoral district in New Brunswick, Canada, that has been represented in the House of Commons of Canada since 1997. Its population in 2001 was 65,877.

Political geography
The district includes all of the County of Madawaska (except Saint-André) and all of the County of Restigouche except the extreme eastern part.

The neighbouring ridings are Miramichi,  Tobique—Mactaquac, Rimouski-Neigette—Témiscouata—Les Basques, Haute-Gaspésie—La Mitis—Matane—Matapédia, and Gaspésie—Îles-de-la-Madeleine.

In 2008, Liberal support was focused in the eastern and central parts of the riding, particularly in Edmundston, Campbellton, and Dalhousie. Support for the Conservatives was centered in the western part of the riding, in a strip of land bordering both Maine and Quebec. There was also a pocket of Tory support outside Saint-Leonard. The NDP won six polls in the riding, all in the Dalhousie area, a community they won.

The electoral district was created in 1996 from Madawaska—Victoria and from Restigouche—Chaleur ridings. This riding will gain a small amount territory from Miramichi as a result of the 2012 federal electoral redistribution.

Members of Parliament

This riding has elected the following Members of Parliament:

Election results

This riding gained some territory from Miramichi for the 42nd Canadian federal election.

See also
 List of Canadian federal electoral districts
 Past Canadian electoral districts

References

 Campaign expense data from Elections Canada
Riding history from the Library of Parliament

Notes

External links
 Politwitter
 Project Democracy
 Pundit's Guide
 StatsCan District Profile

New Brunswick federal electoral districts
Campbellton, New Brunswick
Politics of Edmundston